The 2020 Red Bull MotoGP Rookies Cup was the fourteenth season of the Red Bull MotoGP Rookies Cup. The season, for the eighth year contested by the riders on equal KTM 250cc 4-stroke Moto3 bikes, was held over 12 races in six meetings on the Grand Prix motorcycle racing calendar, beginning at Spielberg on 15 August and ending on 15 November at the Circuit Ricardo Tormo.

Calendar

Entry list

Championship standings
Points were awarded to the top fifteen riders, provided the rider finished the race.

References

External links

Red Bull MotoGP Rookies Cup
Red Bull MotoGP Rookies Cup racing seasons